ASE may refer to:

Organisations
 Academia de Studii Economice (the Economic Sciences Academy), in Bucharest, Romania
 Admiralty Signal Establishment, a former defense research organization in the UK
 ASE Group (Advanced Semiconductor Engineering), 
 African School of Economics, a private university located in Benin
 Agence spatiale européenne, the French name for European Space Agency
 Alliance to Save Energy, a non-profit coalition in Washington, D.C., US
 Amalgamated Society of Engineers
 American Society of Echocardiography
 Amity School of Engineering, a private engineering college located in Noida, India
 The National Institute for Automotive Service Excellence, a certification organization for American and Canadian automotive repair
 The Association for Science Education, a professional association in the United Kingdom for teachers of science
 Association for Social Economics, an international association dedicated to social economics
 Association of Space Explorers, a non-governmental space organization of international astronauts
 Atomstroyexport, the Russian nuclear power equipment and service export monopoly
 Auslands- und Spezialeinsätze, a specialised police unit within the Federal Criminal Police Office (Germany)
 Australian Screen Editors, an Australian film editing guild headquartered in Sydney
 Automotive Service Excellence, a U.S.-based group to improve the quality of automobile servicing

Stock exchanges
 Ahmedabad Stock Exchange, the second oldest exchange in India
 Alberta Stock Exchange, a defunct stock exchange in Calgary
 American Stock Exchange, now known as NYSE American
 Amman Stock Exchange, the Jordanian stock exchange
 ASE Market Capitalization Weighted Index, a stock index of the Amman Stock Exchange in Jordan.
 Athens Stock Exchange, the Greek stock exchange
 Australian Securities Exchange

Science and technology
 Accelerated solvent extraction, a method for extracting chemicals from a matrix

 Amplified spontaneous emission or superluminescence
 Advanced silicon etching, a deep reactive ion etching

Computing
 Accredited Solutions Expert, Hewlett Packard Enterprise Company  
 Adaptive Server Enterprise, a database product from Sybase
 Android Scripting Environment, now known as Scripting Layer for Android
 Application-specific extensions, supplemental optional architectural extensions in the MIPS architecture
 Applied Systems Engineering

 ASCII Scene Export, a file format originated in 3D Studio
 The All-Seeing Eye, an application to help Internet gamers find game servers

Publication
 Anatomical Sciences Education, an academic journal
 Anglo-Saxon England (journal), an academic journal
 Armed Services Editions (ACEs), a paperback book format used during World War II

Other uses
 Aspen–Pitkin County Airport (IATA airport code)
 American Silver Eagle, an American bullion coin for precious-metal investors
 International Conference on Automated Software Engineering, an academic conference
 American Sign Language ISO code

See also
 Ase (disambiguation)